Thaumatin (also known as talin) is a low-calorie sweetener and flavor modifier. The protein is often used primarily for its flavor-modifying properties and not exclusively as a sweetener.

The thaumatins were first found as a mixture of proteins isolated from the katemfe fruit (Thaumatococcus daniellii) (Marantaceae) of West Africa.  Although very sweet, thaumatin's taste is markedly different from sugar's.  The sweetness of thaumatin builds very slowly. Perception lasts a long time, leaving a liquorice-like aftertaste at high concentrations. Thaumatin is highly water soluble, stable to heating, and stable under acidic conditions.

Biological role 
Thaumatin production is induced in katemfe in response to an attack upon the plant by viroid pathogens. Several members of the thaumatin protein family display significant in vitro inhibition of hyphal growth and sporulation by various fungi. The thaumatin protein is considered a prototype for a pathogen-response protein domain. This thaumatin domain has been found in species as diverse as rice and Caenorhabditis elegans.
Thaumatins are pathogenesis-related (PR) proteins, which are induced by various agents ranging from ethylene to pathogens themselves, and are structurally diverse and ubiquitous in plants: They include thaumatin, osmotin, tobacco major and minor PR proteins, alpha-amylase/trypsin inhibitor, and P21 and PWIR2 soybean and wheat leaf proteins. The proteins are involved in systematically-acquired stress resistance and stress responses in plants, although their precise role is unknown. Thaumatin is an intensely sweet-tasting protein (on a molar basis about 100,000 times as sweet as sucrose) found in the fruit of the West African plant Thaumatococcus daniellii: it is induced by attack by viroids, which are single-stranded unencapsulated RNA molecules that do not code for protein. The thaumatin protein I consists of a single polypeptide chain of 207 residues.

Like other PR proteins, thaumatin is predicted to have a mainly beta structure, with a high content of beta-turns and little helix. Tobacco cells exposed to gradually increased salt concentrations develop a greatly increased tolerance to salt, due to the expression of osmotin, a member of the PR protein family. Wheat plants attacked by barley powdery mildew express a PR protein (PWIR2), which results in resistance against that infection. The similarity between this PR protein and other PR proteins and the maize alpha-amylase/trypsin inhibitor has suggested that PR proteins may act as some form of inhibitor.

Within West Africa, the katemfe fruit has been locally cultivated and used to flavour foods and beverages for some time.  The fruit's seeds are encased in a membranous sac, or aril, that is the source of thaumatin.  In the 1970s, Tate and Lyle began extracting thaumatin from the fruit. In 1990, researchers at Unilever reported the isolation and sequencing of the two principal proteins found in thaumatin, which they dubbed thaumatin I and thaumatin II.  These researchers were also able to express thaumatin in genetically engineered bacteria.

Thaumatin has been approved as a sweetener in the European Union (E957), Israel, and Japan.  In the United States, it is generally recognized as safe as a flavouring agent (FEMA GRAS 3732) but not as a sweetener.

Crystallization
Since thaumatin crystallizes very quickly and easily in the presence of tartrate ions,  thaumatin-tartrate mixtures are frequently used as model systems to study protein crystallization.  The solubility of thaumatin, its crystal habit, and mechanism of crystal formation are dependent upon the chirality of precipitant used. When crystallized with L- tartrate, thaumatin forms bipyramidal crystals and displays a solubility that increases with temperature; with D- and meso-tartrate, it forms stubby and prismatic crystals and displays a solubility that decreases with temperature.  This suggests control of precipitant chirality may be an important factor in protein crystallization in general.

Characteristics 
As a food ingredient, thaumatin is considered to be safe for consumption. In a Swiss chewing gum production plant, thaumatin has been identified as an allergen. Thaumatin powder led to allergic symptoms in the upper airways in occupationally exposed individuals. After the factory replaced powdered thaumatin with a liquid form, all of the affected individuals became completely free of symptoms.

Thaumatin interacts with human TAS1R3 receptor to produce a sweet taste. The interacting residues are specific to old world monkeys and apes (including humans); only these animals can perceive it as sweet.

See also 
Curculin, a sweet protein from Malaysia with taste-modifying activity
Miraculin, a protein from West Africa with taste-modifying activity
Monellin, a sweet protein found in West Africa
Stevia, a non-nutritive sweetener up to 150 times sweeter than sugar
Lugduname, a sweetening agent up to 300,000 times sweeter than sugar

References

Further reading

External links

Sugar substitutes
Protein domains
Food science
Plant proteins
E-number additives